Pol-e Abdugh (also Romanized as Pol-e Ābdūgh and Pol Ābdūgh) is a village in Howmeh-ye Sharqi Rural District, in the Central District of Izeh County, Khuzestan Province, Iran. At the 2006 census, its population was 238, in 42 families.

References 

Populated places in Izeh County